Me and the Colonel is a 1958 American comedy film based on the play Jacobowsky und der Oberst by Franz Werfel. It was directed by Peter Glenville and stars Danny Kaye, Curd Jürgens and Nicole Maurey.

Kaye won a Golden Globe Award for Best Actor in a Motion Picture Musical or Comedy for his portrayal. The writers won a Writers Guild of America Award for Best Written Comedy.

Plot
In Paris during the World War II invasion of France by Nazi Germany, Jewish refugee S. L. Jacobowsky (Danny Kaye) seeks to leave the country before it falls. Meanwhile, Polish diplomat Dr. Szicki (Ludwig Stössel) gives antisemitic, autocratic Polish Colonel Prokoszny (Curt Jürgens) secret information that must be delivered to London by a certain date.

The resourceful Jacobowsky, who has had to flee from the Nazis several times previously, manages to "buy" an automobile from the absent Baron Rothschild's chauffeur. Prokoszny peremptorily requisitions the car, but finds he must accept an unwelcome passenger when he discovers that Jacobowsky has had the foresight to secure gasoline. The ill-matched pair (coincidentally from the same village in Poland) and the colonel's orderly, Szabuniewicz (Akim Tamiroff), drive away.

Jacobowsky is dismayed when the colonel first heads to Reims in the direction of the advancing German army to pick up his girlfriend, Suzanne Roualet (Nicole Maurey), a French innkeeper's daughter. Prior to their arrival, Suzanne attracts the unwanted admiration of German Major Von Bergen (Alexander Scourby), but he is called away before he can become better acquainted with her.

As they flee south, Jacobowsky begins to fall in love with Suzanne. At one stop, Jacobowsky manages to find the group magnificent lodgings at a chateau by telling its proud royalist owner that unoccupied France is to become a monarchy headed by the colonel. A drunk Prokoszny challenges Jacobowsky to a duel, but Jacobowsky manages to defuse the situation. When the Germans, under Von Bergen, occupy the chateau, the foursome barely get away.

They are chased by Von Bergen, but the assistance of a sympathetic Mother Superior (Martita Hunt) enables them to shake off their pursuers and reach a prearranged rendezvous with a British submarine. There, however, the submarine's commander informs them that there is only room for two. Suzanne makes the colonel and Jacobowsky go, while she remains behind to fight the invaders in her own way.

Cast
 Danny Kaye as S.L. Jacobowsky 
 Curd Jürgens as Colonel Prokoszny (as Curt Jurgens) 
 Nicole Maurey as Suzanne Roualet 
 Françoise Rosay as Madame Bouffier (as Francoise Rosay) 
 Akim Tamiroff as Szabuniewicz 
 Martita Hunt as Mother Superior 
 Alexander Scourby as Major Von Bergen 
 Liliane Montevecchi as Cosette
 Ludwig Stössel as Dr. Szicki (as Ludwig Stossel) 
 Gérard Buhr as German Captain (as Gerard Buhr) 
 Franz Roehn as Monsieur Girardin 
 Celia Lovsky as Mme. Arle 
 Clément Harari as Man of the Gestapo (as Clement Harari) 
 Alain Bouvette as Rothschild's Chauffeur 
 Albert Godderis as M. Gravat
 Peter Glenville as Submarine Captain (uncredited)

Production
The film was William Goetz's first film in a six-picture deal for Columbia.

Reception
The film was well reviewed but did not do well at the box office. Herbert Feinstein in Film Quarterly, wrote that "Willam Goetz ... produces the minor miracle of creating a credible modern-day fairy tale." He lauded all of the main actors, but singled out Kaye for even higher praise, stating, "The director (Peter Glenville) doubtless is a genius, for he has taken this batch of variously outrageous personalities and muted them into a team: in the case of Kaye, the alchemy achieves pure gold."

References

External links
 
 
 
 1945 Theatre Guild on the Air radio adaptation of original play at Internet Archive

1958 films
1958 comedy films
American comedy films
American black-and-white films
American buddy films
Columbia Pictures films
Films scored by George Duning
American films based on plays
Films directed by Peter Glenville
Films featuring a Best Musical or Comedy Actor Golden Globe winning performance
Films set in France
American World War II films
1950s English-language films
1950s American films